Aaron Roterfeld is an Austrian musician, who is the front man and songwriter for the band Roterfeld.

Early life 
Roterfeld was born in Innsbruck as Marnus Flatz. He was given piano lessons by various teachers, including his mother, herself a piano teacher, and began writing his own songs at the age of 12. Against his parents’ will, he dropped out of school at 17 and went to Africa, where he embarked on audacious expeditions across the Okawango Delta in Botswana on foot and the through the Eastern Highlands of Zimbabwe on horseback. He returned to Austria at the age of 18.

Career 

Roterfeld became a radio presenter at ORF, before moving on to a private radio station in 1998. In cooperation with this station, he set up a recording studio in 1999 and in 2001 developed an algorithm which enabled radio programmes to be controlled automatically by software.

He only came onto the music scene in 2011, when his song "STOP" from the album "Blood Diamond Romance" stayed in the top 10 of the German club charts (deutsche Clubcharts, DAC) for 8 weeks.

In 2015, it emerged that he had spent some time song writing in Lebanon. During a student demonstration there, he was hit by a tear gas projectile.
Shortly after this, Roterfeld released an alternative music video to the song Blood Diamond Romance, which he dedicated to the students’ demands for more political transparency.

Aaron Roterfeld is actively engaged in education, humanitarian projects and animal protection.

External links 
 
 Aaron Roterfeld at Allmusic

References 

Year of birth missing (living people)
Living people
Musicians from Innsbruck
Austrian pianists
Austrian songwriters
Male songwriters
Male pianists
21st-century pianists
21st-century male musicians